Schrebera trichoclada, the wing-leaved wooden pear, is a plant in the family Oleaceae.

Description

Distribution and habitat
Schrebera trichoclada is native to an area of southern tropical Africa from the Democratic Republic of the Congo southeast to Mozambique. Its habitat is deciduous woodland.

References

trichoclada
Flora of the Democratic Republic of the Congo
Flora of Tanzania
Flora of South Tropical Africa
Flora of Botswana
Flora of Namibia
Plants described in 1869